Papa Bouba Diop (28 January 197829 November 2020) was a Senegalese professional footballer. His preferred position was defensive midfield but he could also play as a centre back, where he previously played at Lens. Diop was considered a strong and aggressive player. His playing style and ability drew comparisons to Patrick Vieira.

Diop spent much of his career in England, where fans nicknamed him "The Wardrobe" for his stature. He played for Fulham and Portsmouth in the Premier League, and won the FA Cup with the latter club in 2008. He also played top-flight football in Switzerland for Neuchâtel Xamax and Grasshopper, in France for Lens and in Greece for AEK Athens.

Diop's second of a total of 11 international goals for Senegal came in a 1–0 victory over then-world champions France in the opening match of the 2002 FIFA World Cup, in Senegal's first match at the FIFA World Cup. He also played at four Africa Cup of Nations tournaments, finishing as runners-up in 2002.

Club career

Early career
Diop was born in Rufisque, Dakar. He began his football career with junior team Ndeffann Saltigue before joining ASC Diaraf of the Senegal Premier League in 1996. He left Senegal for Switzerland, where he spent a few months with third-tier club Vevey before signing as a professional for Ligue Nationale A club Neuchâtel Xamax in the 2000 close season. In December that same year, he joined fellow top-flight club Grasshoppers, whom he helped win the championship title in his first half-season and made his first appearance in UEFA competitions the next. He moved to France in January 2002 to join Lens of Ligue 1 on a five-and-a-half-year contract.

Fulham
After his impressive performances for Lens, Papa Boupa Diop signed with Premier League team Fulham for £6 million, signing a four-year deal in July 2004. Diop made his debut against Manchester City on 14 August 2004, playing the full 90 minutes. Diop scored his first goal for Fulham against Chelsea, scoring Fulham's only goal in a 4–1 home defeat. In his first season at Fulham, Diop made such an impressive display for the club that he was named Fulham's Opta player of the season award for 2004–05.

Former Fulham manager Lawrie Sanchez said that Diop had all the attributes to become one of the best midfielders in the Premiership. He said, "There's no reason why Bouba can't get himself up to being one of the best centre midfield players in the Premiership and that's where I see his long-term position. I've seen Diop play over the years and he has all the attributes to be a top-class midfielder".

For his performances during the 2005–06 season, Diop was nominated for the Fulham "Player of the Year" award. Diop would then sign a new deal keeping him until 2009. Diop then said that he made a right decision to sign a contract with Fulham. Diop became a fans' favourite.

An injury due to hamstring, foot, and back problems resulted in him missing part of the 2006–07 season and losing the captaincy to Danny Murphy. In January 2007 Wigan Athletic made a £5 million bid for the midfielder, but Diop decided against the move and stayed with Fulham, helping them to avoid relegation.

After Diop's three years at Craven Cottage Fulham manager Lawrie Sanchez allowed him to move on, and he transferred to Portsmouth on transfer deadline day. Diop finished his Fulham career having played 84 matches for the side, scoring nine goals.

Portsmouth
Diop signed a five-year deal with Portsmouth for a fee of £3.5 million. He made his debut against Liverpool on 15 September 2007 in a 0–0 draw. Diop was a key player in Portsmouth's victorious 2008 FA Cup campaign, playing a solid, defensive game and making some crucial tackles against Cardiff City.

Following Portsmouth's relegation, Diop was considered likely to be released. Portsmouth's administrator, Andrew Andronikou, stated that Diop would only be leaving for a fee of £1 million, but Portsmouth eventually agreed to an undisclosed fee (reported as around £750,000) to transfer Diop to AEK Athens in July 2010. He played 72 games for Portsmouth without scoring.

AEK Athens
On 13 July 2010, Diop agreed terms with AEK Athens signing a two-year deal earning €900,000 per season, despite interest from Fulham, Celtic and Paris Saint-Germain.

Diop made his debut for AEK Athens against Dundee United on 19 August 2010 in a Europa League play-off first-leg game. Diop appeared as a substitute at the 81st minute of the 1–0 victory. Diop scored his first Super League goal against PAOK on 3 June 2011, the match finished 4–0 to AEK. Bouba Diop finished the season having played in only 19 league games. On 30 April 2011, Diop won the Greek Cup with AEK in a 3–0 win against Atromitos. Diop also scored two goals against PAOK in the Superleague Greece play-offs giving AEK the 3–0 lead.

West Ham United
On 30 August 2011, West Ham announced the signing of Diop on a one-year deal. He joined on a free transfer after leaving AEK Athens. The deal included an option to sign for a further year. He made his debut for West Ham on 1 October 2011 in a 2–2 away draw with Crystal Palace. He scored his first and only goal for West Ham, against Barnsley on 17 December 2011. His goal proved to be the winner in a 1–0 win. He made 16 appearances for West Ham in the league and was a popular member of the squad. Although not a team member on the day, Diop celebrated on the pitch with the team as they won promotion to the Premier League via the 2012 Football League Championship play-off Final at Wembley Stadium on 19 May 2012. On 30 June 2012, Diop was released by West Ham on expiry of his contract.

Birmingham City
In October 2012, he agreed terms to join former teammate Lee Clark's Birmingham City on a short-term contract, subject to successful application for a working visa, and the deal was completed on 19 October. He then signed for a further month, and finally made his Birmingham debut as a second-half substitute in a 1–1 draw away to Blackpool on 27 November. He was booked within minutes of entering the game. With Hayden Mullins suspended and Jonathan Spector injured for the visit of Crystal Palace on 15 December, Diop made his first start for Birmingham, alongside League debutant Callum Reilly in central midfield. He scored the equalising goal, a powerful header from Rob Hall's corner, as Birmingham came back from 2–0 down to draw, and was rewarded with another month's contract. He injured a hamstring soon afterwards, and despite his imminent return to fitness, the club's financial difficulties meant they could not offer him a further contract extension. He left the club in January 2013.

International career
Bouba Diop received his first call-up to the Senegal national squad in 1999, at the age of 21, while playing for Neuchâtel Xamax in the Swiss Super League. He was part of their squad that finished runners-up at the 2002 Africa Cup of Nations in Mali, and scored the opening goal of a 2–1 win over Nigeria in the semi-finals.

He is perhaps best known for scoring the first goal of 2002 FIFA World Cup against France, which resulted in the 1–0 defeat of the defending world champions and, ultimately, their early elimination from the tournament, in which Senegal reached the quarter-finals. He ended as his team's best scorer of the tournament with three goals, having also scored twice against Uruguay. Diop celebrated his goal against France by running to the corner of the pitch, laying his shirt on the floor, and having his teammates dance around it.

Diop played at three more Africa Cup of Nations tournaments: in 2004 he scored in a 3–0 group win over Kenya in Tunisia, and in 2006 he netted in a 3–2 victory against Guinea in the quarter-finals. His last appearances were in a group-stage elimination in Ghana in 2008, in which Senegal manager Henryk Kasperczak resigned during the tournament due to the team's ill discipline. Diop played 63 times for Senegal, scoring 11 goals.

During the 2022 World Cup, Senegal dedicated their win over Ecuador to Diop on the second anniversary of his death.

Style of play
His manager at Fulham, Chris Coleman, described him as a player with "great feet, scores goals, defends well, tackles, has got good pace", and that his "stature and ability" were unique in the Premier League at the time, similar to that of Patrick Vieira. Former Manchester United midfielder Paul Scholes described him as one of the most "awkward" players he had played against, and noted that "you get involved physically with him and you're wasting your time".

Death
Diop died in Paris on 29 November 2020 following a long illness. It was reported by L'Équipe that he had ALS.

Diop's funeral was held in Dakar on 4 December before burial in his hometown. In attendance were his widow Marie Aude, their son and daughter, President of Senegal Macky Sall and teammates from the 2002 World Cup.

Career statistics

Club

International

Scores and results list Senegal's goal tally first, score column indicates score after each Diop goal.

Honours
Grasshoppers
 Swiss Super League: 2000–01

Portsmouth
 FA Cup: 2007–08

AEK Athens
 Greek Cup: 2010–11

Senegal
Africa Cup of Nations runner-up: 2002

References

External links
 
 
 Profile, stats and pictures of Bouba Diop

1978 births
2020 deaths
Footballers from Dakar
Association football midfielders
Senegalese footballers
Senegal international footballers
FC Vevey United players
Neuchâtel Xamax FCS players
Grasshopper Club Zürich players
RC Lens players
Fulham F.C. players
Portsmouth F.C. players
AEK Athens F.C. players
West Ham United F.C. players
Birmingham City F.C. players
Swiss Super League players
Ligue 1 players
Premier League players
English Football League players
Super League Greece players
2002 FIFA World Cup players
2002 African Cup of Nations players
2004 African Cup of Nations players
2006 Africa Cup of Nations players
2008 Africa Cup of Nations players
FA Cup Final players
Senegalese expatriate footballers
Senegalese expatriate sportspeople in Switzerland
Expatriate footballers in Switzerland
Senegalese expatriate sportspeople in France
Expatriate footballers in France
Senegalese expatriate sportspeople in England
Expatriate footballers in England
Neurological disease deaths in France
Deaths from motor neuron disease